A sales quote allows a prospective buyer to see the costs that will be involved for desired work. Many businesses provide services that cannot have an upfront price because the costs involved can vary. This can be due to the materials used, which can differ depending on the individual needs of the customer, and the necessary manpower. Therefore, it is common practice for these companies to provide the potential customer with an estimate of the cost. This quotation will be made by the company using the information that the potential customer provides, regarding relevant elements that may affect the price. A quote assists a prospective buyer in deciding a company or service. Because quality and professionalism within a company is usually considered along with price, most companies provide prospective customers with portfolios and examples of previous work.

See also 
 Sales order
 Request for quotation
 Order (business)
 Invoice
 Receipt

Sales